The 2024 California State Senate election will be held on Tuesday, November 5, 2024, with the primary election being held on June 4, 2024. Voters in the 20 odd-numbered districts of the California State Senate will elect their representatives. The elections will coincide with the elections for other offices, including the state Assembly.

Retiring incumbents 
1st: Brian Dahle (R–Bieber): Termed out of office
3rd: Bill Dodd  (D–Napa): Termed out of office
5th: Susan Eggman (D–Stockton): Termed out of office
9th: Nancy Skinner (D–Berkeley): Termed out of office
21st: Scott Wilk (R–Santa Clarita): Termed out of office
25th: Anthony Portantino (D–La Canada Flintridge): Termed out of office, Running for 
31st: Richard Roth (D–Riverside): Termed out of office
35th: Steven Bradford (D–Gardena): Termed out of office
37th: Dave Min (D–Irvine): Running for 
39th: Toni Atkins (D–San Diego): Termed out of office

District 1 

The 1st district encompasses most of the Redwood Forest region and northwestern Sierra Nevada to include Siskiyou, Modoc, Lassen, Shasta, Tehama, Plumas, Glenn, Colusa, Butte, Sutter, Yuba, Nevada, and Sierra counties, along with eastern Placer County. The incumbent is Republican Brian Dahle of Bieber, who is term limited in 2024.

Candidates

Declared
Megan Dahle (Republican), incumbent state assemblywoman for California's 1st State Assembly district (2019–present)

District 3 

Including the eastern California Wine Country and University of California, Davis, the 3rd district consists of Napa, Yolo, and Solano counties. The incumbent is Democrat Bill Dodd of Napa, who is term limited in 2024.

Candidates

Potential
Martha Guerrero (Democratic), mayor of West Sacramento

District 5 

The 5th district encompasses the northern Central Valley, containing San Joaquin County and the northeastern portion of Alameda County, including the communities of Midway, Altamont, Ulmar, Livermore, Dublin, Pleasanton, and Sunol. The incumbent is Democrat Susan Eggman of Stockton, who is term limited in 2024.

Candidates

Declared
Rhodesia Ransom (Democratic), former Tracy city councilwoman
Edith Villapudua (Democratic), realtor and wife of Carlos Villapudua, incumbent state assemblyman for California's 13th State Assembly district

Potential
Miguel Villapudua (Democratic), San Joaquin County supervisor

District 7 

The 7th district encompasses most of Contra Costa County, including Concord, Antioch, Pittsburg, Bay Point, Martinez, Pleasant Hill, Walnut Creek, Lafayette, Danville, San Ramon, and Orinda, along with Castro Valley, San Lorenzo, and San Leandro in Alameda County. The incumbent is Democrat Steve Glazer of Orinda, who is up for reelection in 2024.

District 9 

The East Bay-based 9th district consists of the urban, coastal northwestern portion of Alameda County, including Alameda, Oakland, Piedmont, Emeryville, Berkeley, El Cerrito, and Richmond. The incumbent is Democrat Nancy Skinner of Berkeley, who is term limited in 2024.

Candidates

Declared
Jesse Arreguín (Democratic), mayor of Berkeley (2016–present)
Jovanka Beckles (Democratic), member of the Alameda-Contra Costa Transit Board of Directors
Dan Kalb (Democratic), Oakland city councilman (2013–present)
Kathryn Lybarger (Democratic), president of California Labor Federation

District 11 

The 11th district consists of San Francisco County and Daly City at the northern tip of San Mateo County. The incumbent is Democrat Scott Wiener of San Francisco, who is up for reelection in 2024.

Candidates

Potential
Scott Wiener (Democratic), incumbent state senator

District 13 

The 13th district encompasses the southern Bay Area to take in most of San Mateo County, including the communities of South San Francisco, Pacifica, San Bruno, Millbrae, Burlingame, San Mateo, Foster City, El Granada, Half Moon Bay, San Carlos, Redwood City, Woodside, and Menlo Park, along with the western Santa Clara County communities of Palo Alto, Stanford, Mountain View, Cupertino, Saratoga, and Los Gatos.  The incumbent is first-term Democrat Josh Becker of Menlo Park, who is up for reelection in 2024.

Candidates

Declared
Josh Becker (Democratic), incumbent state senator

District 15 

The 15th district encompasses central and eastern Santa Clara County. Most of the district's population lives in San Jose, but it also includes some outlying areas like Mount Hamilton, Coyote, Sveadal, Morgan Hill, and Gilroy. The incumbent is first-term Democrat Dave Cortese of San Jose, who is up for reelection in 2024.

Candidates

Declared
Dave Cortese (Democratic), incumbent state senator

District 17 

The 17th district consists of the Big Sur section of the Central Coast, including Santa Cruz. San Benito, and Monterey counties, along with northern San Luis Obispo County. The incumbent is Democrat John Laird of Santa Cruz, who is up for reelection in 2024.

Candidates

Declared
John Laird (Democratic), incumbent state senator

District 19 

The 19th district encompasses much of the Mojave Desert as well as most of the Inland Empire's land area. It includes the central San Bernardino County communities of Barstow, Hodge, Apple Valley, Crestline, Big Bear City, Grand Terrace, Loma Linda, Redlands, Yucaipa, Yucca Valley, Joshua Tree, and Twentynine Palms, and the central Riverside County communities of Beaumont, Banning, Desert Hot Springs, Palm Springs, Cathedral City, Palm Desert, Indian Wells, and La Quinta. The incumbent is first-term Republican Rosilicie Ochoa Bogh of Yucaipa and the former 23rd district, who is up for reelection in 2024.

Candidates

Declared
Rosilicie Ochoa Bogh (Republican), incumbent state senator

District 21 

The 21st district consists of Santa Barbara County and southern San Luis Obispo County, along with the northern and western portions of Ventura County, including Ojai, Fillmore, Santa Paula, Ventura, Oxnard, Camarillo, and Port Hueneme. The incumbent is first-term Democrat Monique Limón of Santa Barbara and the former 19th district, who is up for reelection in 2024.

Candidates

Declared
Monique Limón (Democratic), incumbent state senator

District 23 

The 23rd district encompasses the Antelope Valley and Victor Valley. It includes the northern Los Angeles County communities of Santa Clarita, Quartz Hill, Lancaster, Palmdale, Acton, and Lake Los Angeles, along with the western San Bernardino County communities of Phelan, Adelanto, Victorville, and Hesperia. The incumbent is Republican Scott Wilk of Santa Clarita and the former 21st district, who is term limited in 2024.

Candidates

Declared
Kipp Mueller (Democratic), civil rights attorney and candidate for California's 21st State Senate district in 2020
Suzette Martinez Valladares (Republican), former state assemblywoman for California's 38th State Assembly district (2020–2022)

Potential
Ollie McCaulley (Democratic), U.S. Marine Corps veteran and president of Gonzales-McCaul­ley Investment Group Inc, an acquisition training school

District 25 

The 25st district encompasses the western San Gabriel Valley in Los Angeles County, including the communities of Glendale, La Cañada Flintridge, Altadena, Pasadena, South Pasadena, San Marino, Alhambra, Monterey Park, San Gabriel, Rosemead, Temple City, Arcadia, Sierra Madre, Monrovia, the east San Gabriel Valley city of Glendora, and the Pomona Valley city of Claremont. The incumbent is Democrat Anthony Portantino of La Canada Flintridge, who is term limited in 2024.

Candidates

Declared
Elizabeth Ahlers (Republican), Crescenta Valley town councilwoman
John Harabedian (Democratic), former mayor of Sierra Madre (2012–2020)
Sasha Renée Pérez (Democratic), Alhambra city councilwoman

District 27 

The 27th district consists of the eastern Ventura County communities of Moorpark, Thousand Oaks, Simi Valley, Santa Susana, Hidden Valley, and Lake Sherwood, and the western San Fernando Valley communities of Granada Hills, Porter Ranch, Chatsworth, West Hills, Woodland Hills, and Tarzana in the northwestern corner of Los Angeles. The incumbent is Democrat Henry Stern of Malibu, who is up for reelection in 2024.

Candidates

Declared
Henry Stern (Democratic), incumbent state senator

Potential

District 29 

The new 29th district encompasses the urban southwestern portion of San Bernardino County, including the cities of San Bernardino, Highland, Colton, Rialto, Bloomington, Fontana, Rancho Cucamonga, and Upland. The district has no incumbent.

Candidates

Declared
Eloise Reyes (Democratic), majority leader of the California State Assembly (2020–present)

District 31 

The 31st district encompasses the urban northwestern portion of Riverside County, including the cities of Riverside, Corona, Eastvale, Jurupa Valley, Moreno Valley, Mead Valley, Perris, and Nuevo. The incumbent is Democrat Richard Roth of Riverside, who is term limited in 2024.

Candidates

Declared
Sabrina Cervantes (Democratic), incumbent state assemblywoman for California's 58th State Assembly district (2022–present) and California's 60th State Assembly district (2016–2022)
Angelo Farooq (Democratic), trustee of the Riverside Unified School District board

District 33 

The 33rd district consists of the southern Gateway Cities of Los Angeles County, including Long Beach, Signal Hill, Lakewood, Paramount, Lynwood, South Gate, Cudahy, Huntington Park, Bell, Maywood, Bell Gardens, and Commerce. The incumbent is Democrat Lena Gonzalez of Long Beach, who is up for reelection in 2024.

Candidates

Declared
Lena Gonzalez (Democratic), incumbent state senator
Sharifah Hardie (no party preference), business consultant

District 35 

The 35th district consists of the southwestern Los Angeles County communities of Inglewood, Hawthorne, Lawndale, Westmont, Willowbrook, Compton, and Carson, and the Los Angeles neighborhoods of Watts, Harbor City, Wilmington, and San Pedro.  The incumbent is Democrat Steven Bradford of Gardena, who is term limited in 2024.

Candidates

Declared
Jennifer Williams (Democratic), member of the Los Angeles County Citizens Economy and Efficiency Commission

Potential
Alex Monteiro (Democratic), Hawthorne city councilman

District 37 

The new 37th district encompasses much of central Orange County, including Orange, El Modena, Villa Park. Tustin, Irvine, Costa Mesa, Lake Forest, El Toro, Laguna Woods, Aliso Viejo, and Laguna Niguel.  The incumbents in this area is second-term Democrat Josh Newman of Fullerton and the former 29th district and first-term Democrat David Min of Irvine and the former 37th district.

Candidates

Declared
Steven Choi (Republican), former state assemblyman for California's 68th State Assembly district (2016–2022) and former mayor of Irvine (2012–2016)
Alex Mohajer (Democratic), activist and president of Stonewall Democrats
Josh Newman (Democratic), incumbent state senator for California's 29th State Senate district (2020–present; 2016–2018)

Potential
John Moorlach (Republican), former state senator for California's 37th State Senate district (2015–2020)
Benjamin Yu (Republican), Lake Forest city councilman

Declined
Dave Min (Democratic), incumbent state senator for California's 37th State Senate district (2020–present) (running for California's 47th congressional district)

District 39 

The new 39th district encompasses much of San Diego, including the neighborhoods of Point Loma, Ocean Beach, Hillcrest, North Park, Linda Vista, San Carlos, Encanto, and Paradise Hills, along with the San Diego suburbs of Coronado, La Mesa, Lemon Grove, El Cajon, La Presa, Casa de Oro, Rancho San Diego, Bostonia, and Crest. The incumbent is Democrat Toni Atkins, who is term-limited in 2024.

Candidates

Declared
Nathan Fletcher (Democratic), chair of the San Diego County Board of Supervisors and former state assemblyman (2008–2012)

See also
 2024 California elections
 2024 California State Assembly election

References

State Senate
California State Senate
California State Senate elections
Politics of California